The 2016 OFC Champions League Final was the final of the 2016 OFC Champions League, the 15th edition of the Oceania Cup, Oceania's premier club football tournament organized by the Oceania Football Confederation (OFC), and the 10th season under the current OFC Champions League name.

The final was played between two New Zealand teams, Auckland City and Team Wellington. It was played at the QBE Stadium in Auckland on 23 April 2016. The winner earned the right to represent the OFC at the 2016 FIFA Club World Cup, entering at the qualifying play-off round.

Auckland City defeated Team Wellington 3–0 to win their sixth consecutive and eighth overall OFC club title.

Background
The final was a rematch of the previous season's final, won by Auckland City 4–3 on penalties (1–1 after extra time).

Auckland City were the five-time defending champions. They have played in seven previous finals, winning all of them in 2006, 2009, 2011, 2012, 2013, 2014, and 2015.

This was the second OFC club final for Team Wellington, following last year's defeat to Auckland City.

Road to final

The final stage of the 2016 OFC Champions League was played in Auckland, New Zealand.

Note: In all results below, the score of the finalist is given first.

Rules
The final was played as a single match. If tied after regulation, extra time and, if necessary, penalty shoot-out would be used to decide the winner.

Match

References

External links
2016 OFC Champions League, oceaniafootball.com

2016
1 Final
2015–16 in New Zealand association football